Thomasia montana, commonly known as hill thomasia, is a species of flowering plant in the family Malvaceae and is endemic to the south-west of Western Australia. It is an upright to low, ground-covering shrub with hairy new growth, egg-shaped to broadly oblong leaves, sometimes with wavy or toothed edges, and pale purplish-pink to maroon flowers.

Description
The edges of the leaves are sometimes wavy or toothed, the lower surface with a few star-shaped hairs. The sepals are pale purplish-pink to maroon and joined for about half their length and the petals are tiny. Flowering occurs in September and October.

Taxonomy and naming
Thomasia montana was first formally described in 1845 by Ernst Gottlieb von Steudel in Lehmann's Plantae Preissianae from specimens collected in 1840. The specific epithet (montana) means "pertaining to mountains".

Distribution and habitat
Hill thomasia grows in woodland and shrubland, sometimes on rocky outcrops or between granite boulders, near Brookton and York in the Avon Wheatbelt and Jarrah Forest bioregions of south-western Western Australia.

Conservation status
Thomasia montana is listed as "vulnerable" under the Australian Government Environment Protection and Biodiversity Conservation Act 1999 and as "Threatened" by the Western Australian Government Department of Biodiversity, Conservation and Attractions, meaning that it is in danger of extinction.

References

montana
Rosids of Western Australia
Plants described in 1845
Taxa named by Ernst Gottlieb von Steudel